This is a complete list of four-star generals in the United States Space Force. The rank of general (or full general, or four-star general), ranks above lieutenant general (three-star general) and is the highest rank achievable in the U.S. Space Force.

There have currently been only three four-star generals in the history of the U.S. Space Force. All achieved that rank while on active duty. Generals entered the Space Force via several paths: Two were commissioned via the Air Force Reserve Officer Training Corps (AFROTC), and one was commissioned via the U.S. Air Force Academy (USAFA).

List of generals

The following lists of four-star generals are sortable by last name, date of rank. The date listed is that of the officer's first promotion to general, and may differ from the officer's entry in the U.S. Space Force register. The year commissioned is taken to be the year the officer was commissioned which may precede the officer's actual date of commission by up to two years. Each entry lists the general's name, date of rank, active-duty position held while serving at four-star rank, number of years of active-duty service at four-star rank (Yrs), year commissioned and source of commission, number of years in commission when promoted to four-star rank (YC), and other biographical notes.

History

Four-star positions

2019–present

The modern rank of general was established by the Officer Personnel Act of 1947, which authorized the President to designate certain positions of importance to carry that rank. Officers appointed to such positions bear temporary four-star rank while so serving, and are allowed to retire at that rank if their performance is judged satisfactory. The total number of active-duty four-star generals in the Space Force is limited to a fixed percentage of the number of Space Force general officers serving at all ranks.

Within the Space Force, the chief of space operations (CSO) is a four-star general by statute. Other four-star generals can occupy positions of designated importance; including the vice chief of space operations (VCSO) and the commander of the United States Space Command (USSPACECOM).

The Space Force also competes with the other services for a number of joint four-star positions, such as the chairman (CJCS) and vice chairman (VJCS) of the Joint Chiefs of Staff. Other joint four-star positions have included unified combatant commanders, sub-unified combatant commands, and certain NATO staff positions.

See also
General (United States)
List of active duty United States four-star officers
List of United States Army four-star generals
List of United States Marine Corps four-star generals
List of United States Navy four-star admirals
List of United States Air Force four-star generals
List of United States Coast Guard four-star admirals
List of United States Public Health Service Commissioned Corps four-star admirals
List of United States Space Force lieutenant generals
List of active duty United States Space Force general officers
List of United States military leaders by rank

References

United States Space Force generals
 
United States Space Force lists
Lists of generals
United States Space Force generals